Les enfants du Pirée is the seventh French language studio album by Dalida, and her first album of the 1960s. It contains big #1 hit "Les enfants du Pirée", and other hits like "T'aimer follement", "Romantica" and "L'Arlequin de Tolède".

In 2002, Barclay Records, then as part of Universal Music France, released a digitally remastered version of the original vinyl in CD and in 10" (25 cm) vinyl record (LP), under the same name, as part of a compilation containing re-releases of all of Dalida's studio albums recorded under the Barclay label. The album was again re-released in 2005.

Track listing
Barclay – 80125 Ⓜ:

References

Dalida albums
1960 albums
Barclay (record label) albums
French-language albums